Kinley Wangchuk may refer to:

 Kinley Wangchuk (politician) (born 1980), Bhutanese politician
 Kinley Wangchuk (footballer) (born 1986), Bhutanese footballer